1987 JSL Cup Final was the 12th final of the JSL Cup competition. The final was played at Nagoya Mizuho Athletics Stadium in Aichi on July 19, 1987. Nippon Kokan won the championship.

Overview
Nippon Kokan won their 2nd title, by defeating Sumitomo Metal 3–0.

Match details

See also
1987 JSL Cup

References

JSL Cup
1987 in Japanese football
Kashima Antlers matches